Sophie the Giraffe is a teether – a toy for teething infants to chew on – in the form of a  hevea rubber giraffe.

History 
The toy has been made in France (as Sophie la Girafe) since 1961, first in Asnières-sur-Oise, near Paris by Delacoste then from 1991 by Vulli based in Rumilly in the French Alps. Its name refers to its launch on 25 May 1961, the feast day of Saint Madeleine Sophie Barat. It has achieved national icon status in France, according to Slate, with more sold each year (816,000 in 2010) than babies are born (796,000).

Sophie is also popular in the United States where the toy has been available for decades and even appeared in the movie Three Men and a Baby (1987) and where it has become the best-selling baby product offered by Amazon.com. Launched in California in the trendy Hollywood area, it became popular through word of mouth, especially on Amazon.com since 2008. The reasons proposed for this success are that it is marketed as eco-friendly and a growing consumer mistrust of the security and health standards of products made in China since 2007.

In 2009, Sophie was recognized as Product of the Year by the American Specialty Toy Retailing Association.

Health concerns
The November 2011 issue of German consumer magazine Öko-Test reported that Sophie the Giraffe should not be sold in Germany due to a violation of statutory limit values for nitrosatable substances. The test found 0.781 mg/kg, while the German Bedarfsgegenständeverordnung (BedGgstV) consumer food and product standard provides for a limit of 0.1 mg/kg. Vulli initially said that another regulation applies, the EU guidelines for toys, with a limit of 1 mg/kg, and obtained a preliminary injunction of the District Court in Berlin banning publication of Öko-Tests report. The story was removed from the magazine's website. This injunction was lifted in January 2012. 

The Chemische und Veterinäruntersuchungsamt Stuttgart (CVUA) reproduced Öko-Tests claims resulting in the German Technischer Überwachungsverein (TÜV) safety agency pressing charges against Vulli, and Öko-Test restored the online report to their web site. Vulli responded by recalling Sophie the Giraffe and similar products from German retailers, and offering to exchange it with one produced on or after March 2012, which Vulli says adhere to the stricter German limit.

References 

1960s toys
Rubber toys
Toy brands
Toy animals
Fictional giraffes